is a former Nippon Professional Baseball outfielder.

External links

1974 births
Living people
Baseball people from Hiroshima Prefecture
Japanese baseball players
Nippon Professional Baseball outfielders
Kintetsu Buffaloes players
Osaka Kintetsu Buffaloes players
Tohoku Rakuten Golden Eagles players
Japanese baseball coaches
Nippon Professional Baseball coaches